Liselotte is a feminine given name which may refer to:

childhood name of Elizabeth Charlotte, Princess Palatine (1652–1722), German princess, sister-in-law of King Louis XIV of France, and prolific letter writer
Liselotte Blumer (born 1957), Swiss retired female badminton player
Liselotte Grschebina (1908–1994), German-born Israeli photographer
Liselotte Herrmann (1909–1938), German Communist Resistance fighter executed by the Nazis
Liselotte Hopfer, German luger who won a silver medal at the 1935 European Championships
Liselotte Landbeck (1916–2013), Austrian figure skater and speed skater
Liselotte Neumann (born 1966), Swedish golfer
LiseLotte Olsson (born 1954), Swedish politician
Liselotte Olsson (born 1968), Swiss sprint canoer
Liselotte Pulver (born 1929), Swiss actress
Liselotte Richter (1906–1968), German philosopher and theologian
Liselotte Schramm-Heckmann (1904–1995), German painter
Liselotte, main character of the manga series Liselotte & Witch's Forest

See also
Lise-Lotte Rebel (born 1951), bishop of the Diocese of Helsingør in the Evangelical Lutheran Church of Denmark

Feminine given names
German feminine given names
Swiss feminine given names